Frösjön is a lake in Södermanland, Sweden, which straddles the boundary between Gnesta Municipality and Stockholm Municipality.  It is 5.8 meters deep and has a surface area of 3.46 square kilometres.

Lakes of Södermanland County
Lakes of Stockholm County